Melissa Poponne Skerrit (born 14 May 1981) is a Dominican politician in the Dominica Labour Party. She has been a member of the House of Assembly for the Roseau Central constituency since the 2019 general election. Skerrit is married to Prime Minister Roosevelt Skerrit and they have two children.

References

1981 births
Living people
Members of the House of Assembly of Dominica
Dominica Labour Party politicians
Dominica women in politics